Black Rock Conservation Park is a protected area located in the Australian state of South Australia in the locality of Erskine about  north of the state capital of Adelaide and about  east of Orroroo.

The conservation park occupies land in section 76 of the cadastral unit of the Hundred of Erskine on the south side of the Orroroo-Paratoo Road. It was proclaimed on 9 November 1972 under the National Parks and Wildlife Act 1972.

A statement of significance prepared in 1980 advises that it preserves “vegetation typical of the region. And that it contains “a diverse avifauna, including the most westerly record of the black-backed wren, now considered to be a variant of the splendid wren.”

The conservation park was described in 1980 as being “located on the outwash from Black Rock, the highest point in the vicinity”, as having a “dominant vegetation consists of a low woodland of Casuarina cristata and Myoporum platycarpum with areas of Eucalyptus socialis over an understorey of Atriplex sp., Kochia sedifolia and Enchylaena tomentosa” and as having a “disturbed natural condition” due to “a long history of grazing.”

In 2004, it was reported as having “good examples of the flora of the area dominated by the Black Oak (Casuarina pauper) and Bluebush (Maireana sedifolia)” and “several creek beds with steep banks suitable for Red-back Kingfishers and Rainbow Bee-eaters to nest.”

The conservation park is classified as an IUCN Category III protected area.  It was listed on the now-defunct Register of the National Estate.

See also
Protected areas of South Australia

References

External links
Black Rock Conservation Park webpage on the Protected Planet website
Black Rock Conservation Rock webpage on vk5pas amateur radio website

Conservation parks of South Australia
Protected areas established in 1972
1972 establishments in Australia
South Australian places listed on the defunct Register of the National Estate